Reservoir 2 is a man-made reservoir located in the northern portion of the city of New Rochelle along the New Rochelle - Eastchester boundary in Westchester County, New York. Constructed in 1892, the reservoir is impounded by the "Reservoir 2 dam" on the Hutchinson River. The reservoir is owned by the City Of New Rochelle.

The water from this reservoir, and from Reservoir 3, was originally pumped at a pumping station into the mains of the high service system to serve the northern portions of New Rochelle.

References

External links
 USGS - Reservoir No. 2

Reservoirs in Westchester County, New York
Reservoirs in New York (state)
Geography of New Rochelle, New York